Flute Soufflé is an album by jazz flautists Herbie Mann and Bobby Jaspar featuring tracks recorded in 1957 for the Prestige label.

Reception

Allmusic reviewer Scott Yanow stated: "Herbie Mann was a flutist who occasionally played tenor and Bobby Jaspar a tenor-saxophonist who doubled on flute. They play their normal instruments on the first song. The second song finds them switching back and forth, while the other two are strictly flute features... Several times the two lead voices interact and trade off during this enjoyable performance".

Track listing
All compositions by Herbie Mann, except as indicated.
 "Tel Aviv" - 14:38    
 "Somewhere Else" (Joe Puma) - 5:55    
 "Let's March" - 7:21    
 "Chasin' the Bird" (Charlie Parker) - 8:13
Recorded March 21, 1957 at the Van Gelder Studio, Hackensack, New Jersey

Personnel 
Herbie Mann, Bobby Jaspar - flute, tenor saxophone
Tommy Flanagan - piano
Joe Puma - guitar
Wendell Marshall - bass
Bobby Donaldson - drums

References 

1957 albums
Herbie Mann albums
Bobby Jaspar albums
Albums produced by Ozzie Cadena
Prestige Records albums